City of the Dead or The City of the Dead may refer to:

Places 
 City of the Dead (Cairo), a cemetery and neighbourhood in Cairo, Egypt
 Dargavs necropolis, an Alanian burial site in North Ossetia-Alania, Russia, referred to as "City of the dead"
 Dead Cities, a group of abandoned settlements in Northwest Syria
 El Tajín, a pre-Columbian archeological site in Mexico whose original name is claimed to have been Mictlan or "place of the dead"
 Myra, a collection of Lycian rock-cut tombs in Antalya Province, Turkey
 Southern Necropolis, a cemetery in Glasgow, Scotland

Films 
 The City of the Dead (film), a 1960 British horror film which had the title Horror Hotel for the US release
 City of the Living Dead, a 1980 horror film by Lucio Fulci
 City of the Walking Dead, the US title for Nightmare City
 Gangs of the Dead, a 2006 American horror film retitled City of the Dead for its German and Italian premieres

Novels 
 City of the Dead (novel), a 2005 novel by Brian Keene
 The City of the Dead (novel), a 2001 Doctor Who novel
 Galaxy of Fear: City of the Dead, a Star Wars novel by John Whitman
 Resident Evil: City of the Dead, a 1999 novelisation of the video game Resident Evil 2

Others 
 "City of the Dead", a song by The Clash, the B-side to the "Complete Control" single
 "City of the Dead" (song), a song by the Finnish rock band The Rasmus
 City of the Dead (video game), a canceled video game based on George A. Romero's Dead series

See also
 Necropolis, a term for a cemetery, derived from the Greek for "city of the dead"